The Box Set (also known as Cocteau Twins Singles Collection ) is a 1991 collection of EPs by the Scottish band Cocteau Twins. It features their non-album releases up until that time. It also contains a bonus disc including songs from throughout their history which have not been otherwise released on Cocteau Twins releases.

Track listing
Disc one – Lullabies (1982)
 "Feathers-Oar-Blades" – 4:32
 "Alas Dies Laughing" – 3:40
 "It's All But an Ark Lark" – 8:06
 All Tracks by Fraser, Guthrie & Heggie

Disc two – Peppermint Pig (1983)
 "Peppermint Pig (7" Version)" – 3:24
 "Laugh Lines" – 3:20
 "Hazel" – 2:49
 "Peppermint Pig (12" Version)" – 5:02
 All Tracks by Fraser, Guthrie & Heggie

Disc three – Sunburst and Snowblind (1983)
 "Sugar Hiccup" – 3:41
 "From the Flagstones" – 3:39
 "Hitherto" – 3:56
 "Because of Whirl-Jack" – 3:29
 All Tracks by Fraser & Guthrie

Disc four – The Spangle Maker (1984)
 "The Spangle Maker" – 4:42
 "Pearly-Dewdrop's Drops (12" Version)" – 5:14
 "Pepper-Tree" – 3:47
 "Pearly-Dewdrop's Drops (7" Version)" – 4:11
 All Tracks by Fraser, Guthrie & Raymonde

Disc five – Aikea-Guinea (1985)
 "Aikea-Guinea" – 3:57
 "Kookaburra" – 3:20
 "Quisquose" – 4:10
 "Rococo" – 3:08
 All Tracks by Fraser, Guthrie & Raymonde

Disc six – Tiny Dynamine (1985)
 "Pink Orange Red" – 4:41
 "Ribbed and Veined" – 4:00
 "Plain Tiger" – 4:01
 "Sultitan Itan" – 3:53
 All Tracks by Fraser, Guthrie & Raymonde

Disc seven – Echoes in a Shallow Bay (1985)
 "Great Spangled Fritillary" – 4:02
 "Melonella" – 4:05
 "Pale Clouded White" – 4:59
 "Eggs and Their Shells" – 3:06
 All Tracks by Fraser, Guthrie & Raymonde

Disc eight – Love's Easy Tears (1986)
 "Love's Easy Tears" – 3:37
 "Those Eyes, That Mouth" – 3:38
 "Sigh's Smell of Farewell" – 3:33
 "Orange Appled" – 2:49
 All Tracks by Fraser, Guthrie & Raymonde

Disc nine – Iceblink Luck (1990)
 "Iceblink Luck" – 3:20
 "Mizake The Mizan" – 3:03
 "Watchlar" – 3:17
 All Tracks by Fraser, Guthrie & Raymonde

Disc ten – Bonus disc
 "Dials" – (Fraser, Guthrie & Raymonde) 2:39
 "Crushed" – (Fraser, Guthrie & Raymonde) 3:17
 "The High Monkey-Monk" – (Fraser, Guthrie & Raymonde) 3:07
 "Oomingmak (Instrumental Version)" – (Fraser & Guthrie) 2:43

Bonus disc notes
 "Dials", from the "Heaven or Las Vegas" (1990) US promo 12"/CD single.
 "Crushed", from the compilation Lonely Is an Eyesore (1987) (CAD 703).
 "The High Monkey-Monk", from the Melody Maker compilation Gigantic! II (1990) (MM RT CD002).
 "Oomingmak (Instrumental Version)", previously unreleased, but used as the outro for the Lonely Is An Eyesore video.

References

Cocteau Twins albums
1991 compilation albums